Abadan Island is an island in Iran. It is the site of the city of Abadan. The island hosted Anglo-Iranian Oil Company's Abadan Refinery, around which Mohammad Mossadegh's nationalization movement was centered.

See also
Tidal irrigation at Abadan island, Iran

References

Islands of Iran
Landforms of Khuzestan Province
River islands of Iran